Oldřiška Kaplanová (born 21 December 1944) is a Czechoslovak sprint canoer who competed in the early 1970s. She finished ninth in the K-2 500 m event at the 1972 Summer Olympics in Munich.

References
Sports-reference.com profile

1944 births
Canoeists at the 1972 Summer Olympics
Czechoslovak female canoeists
Living people
Olympic canoeists of Czechoslovakia